Wamba may refer to:

People
 Wamba (king), 7th-century king of the Visigoths on the Iberian peninsula
 Anaclet Wamba (born 1960), Congolese-French professional boxer
 Ernest Wamba dia Wamba (born 1942), Senator and former rebel leader in the Democratic Republic of the Congo
 Philippe Wamba (1971-2002),  African-American writer
 Wamba Wamba, an Australian Aboriginal people

Places
 Wamba, Luo Reserve, a village in the Luo Reserve, Democratic Republic of the Congo
 Wamba, Haut-Uele District, a town in the Haut-Uele Province of the Democratic Republic of the Congo
 Wamba Territory, an administrative area of the Haut-Uele Province of the Democratic Republic of the Congo
 Roman Catholic Diocese of Wamba, Democratic Republic of the Congo
 Wamba, Kenya, a small town in Samburu District, Rift Valley Province in central Kenya
 Wamba Hospital, a hospital in Wamba, Samburu District, Kenya
 Wamba, Nigeria, a Local Government Area of Nasarawa State
 Wamba, Valladolid, a municipality in the province of Valladolid, Castille and León, Spain

Other uses
 Wamba (wamba.com), a social networking website
 Wamba, a Child of the Jungle, a 1913 silent film
 Wamba (spider), a genus of spiders